Dirty Mind is an album by Prince.

Dirty Mind may also refer to:

Dirty Mind (Celly Cel album), 2017
"Dirty Mind" (Prince song), the title track to the album
"Dirty Mind" (The Pipettes song), a 2005
"Dirty Mind" (Shakespears Sister song), 1990
"Dirty Mind", a song by Prism from Beat Street, 1983
"Dirty Mind", a song by Tages from Tages 2, 1966
"Dirty Mind", a song by The Cross from Blue Rock, 1991
"Dirty Mind", a 2015 song by Flo Rida
Dirty Mind Tour, a concert tour by Prince, from December 1980–April 1981
Dirty Minds, a board game made by TDC Games in Itasca
, a 2008 film by Pieter Van Hees
"Dirty Mind", a 2011 song by 3OH!3